TRNA (adenine9-N1)-methyltransferase (Trm10p, tRNA(m1G9/m1A9)-methyltransferase, tRNA(m1G9/m1A9)MTase, TK0422p (gene), tRNA m1A9-methyltransferase, tRNA m1A9 Mtase) is an enzyme with systematic name S-adenosyl-L-methionine:tRNA (adenine9-N1)-methyltransferase. This enzyme catalyses the following chemical reaction

 S-adenosyl-L-methionine + adenine9 in tRNA  S-adenosyl-L-homocysteine + N1-methyladenine9 in tRNA

The enzyme from Sulfolobus acidocaldarius specifically methylates adenine9 in tRNA.

References

External links 
 

EC 2.1.1